In mathematics, Sazonov's theorem, named after Vyacheslav Vasilievich Sazonov, is a theorem in functional analysis.

It states that a bounded linear operator between two Hilbert spaces is γ-radonifying if  it is a Hilbert–Schmidt operator. The result is also important in the study of stochastic processes and the Malliavin calculus, since results concerning probability measures on infinite-dimensional spaces are of central importance in these fields. Sazonov's theorem also has a converse: if the map is not Hilbert–Schmidt, then it is not γ-radonifying.

Statement of the theorem

Let G and H be two Hilbert spaces and let T : G → H be a bounded operator from G to H. Recall that T is said to be γ-radonifying if the push forward of the canonical Gaussian cylinder set measure on G is a bona fide measure on H. Recall also that T is said to be a Hilbert–Schmidt operator if there is an orthonormal basis } of G such that

 

Then Sazonov's theorem is that T is γ-radonifying if it is a Hilbert–Schmidt operator.

The proof uses Prokhorov's theorem.

Remarks

The canonical Gaussian cylinder set measure on an infinite-dimensional Hilbert space can never be a bona fide measure; equivalently, the identity function on such a space cannot be γ-radonifying.

See also

References

 

Stochastic processes
Theorems in functional analysis
Theorems in measure theory